Deniz Hakyemez Çetin Saraç (born 3 February 1983) is a Turkish volleyball player. She studied at Marmara University.

Hakyemez plays for Galatasaray Medical Park. She signed 1-year contract with the team in July 2009.

Awards

Club
 2011-12 Turkish Cup -  Runner-up, with Galatasaray Daikin
 2011-12 CEV Cup -  Runner-up, with Galatasaray Daikin

See also
 Turkish women in sports

References

External links
 FIVB Profile
 
 Deniz Hakyemez Çetinsaraç at WorldofVolley
 Deniz Hakyemez (Çetinsaraç) at Volleybox.net

1983 births
Living people
Turkish women's volleyball players
Eczacıbaşı volleyball players
Beşiktaş volleyballers
VakıfBank S.K. volleyballers
Galatasaray S.K. (women's volleyball) players
Marmara University alumni
Mediterranean Games medalists in volleyball
Mediterranean Games gold medalists for Turkey
Mediterranean Games silver medalists for Turkey
Competitors at the 2005 Mediterranean Games
Competitors at the 2009 Mediterranean Games
21st-century Turkish sportswomen